RUBIN-8, also known as RUBIN-AIS (Automatic Identification System), is a German space experiment package, built by OHB-System, which was launched by the Indian Space Research Organisation, aboard a PSLV rocket, on 28 April 2008. Following launch, it remained bolted to the upper stage of the rocket in low Earth orbit, where it is used to conduct experiments regarding the relay of AIS data via the Orbcomm and Iridium communication satellite networks.

See also
AAUSAT-II
COMPASS-1
CUTE-1.7
Delfi-C3
SEEDS-2

References

Spacecraft launched in 2008